The following is a timeline of the history of Washington, D.C., the capital city of the United States.

18th century
 1752 – February: First survey of Georgetown completed.
 1784 – October 7: Elbridge Gerry of Massachusetts motions “that buildings for the use of Congress be erected on the banks of the Delaware near Trenton, or of the Potomac, near Georgetown, provided a suitable district can be procured on one of the rivers as aforesaid, for a federal town”.
 1789 – Town of Georgetown, Maryland, chartered and incorporated; Georgetown University founded.
 1790 - July 16: Residence Act enacted, selecting a site along the Potomac River as the future location of the permanent seat of the federal government of the United States.  
 1791  
 January 24: Federal District proclamation issued by President George Washington.
 Team led by Andrew Ellicott begins survey of the future boundaries of the original District of Columbia.
 L'Enfant Plan for design of the City of Washington introduced.
 September 9: Commissioners appointed by President Washington name the federal district as "The Territory of Columbia," and the federal city as the "City of Washington."
 1792 – Construction of White House (presidential residence) begins.
 1794 – Tudor Place (residence) built in Georgetown.
 1797 – "Bridge at Little Falls" crossing the upper Potomac River several miles northwest of Georgetown, opens at the future site of 19th century Chain Bridge. 
 1800
 May 14 – November 1: Seat of Federal government of the United States relocated after ten years from second federal capital of Philadelphia (centered at Independence Hall (old Pennsylvania State House) to constitutionally designated ten mile square federal district entitled District of Columbia (on both sides of Potomac River). Originally called the "Federal City", it soon acquires namesake after President Washington, (especially after his recent death a few months earlier at nearby Mount Vernon in December 1799), known in 19th century as Washington city.
 Second President John Adams travels south from former second national capital at Philadelphia and is the first chief executive to occupy the President's House (future White House) in November with his wife Abigail to the unfinished mansion. The Adamses occupy the house for only the last four months of his term, having been defeated for reelection by incumbent Vice President Thomas Jefferson in the Election of 1800 until Jefferson's inauguration the following year on March 4, 1801. 
 United States Capitol building construction continues with partial completion of the north Senate wing where the United States Congress meets for its first sessions in Washington. Construction continues on south House of Representatives south wing. The Senate wing, completed first temporarily provides spaces to be used by both houses of the Congress, the beginnings of the Library of Congress and the Supreme Court for several years of continued construction work.
 Washington Navy Yard established on the Eastern Branch (later known as Anacostia River) of the Potomac River waterfront south of the under-construction Capitol.
 Population: 14,093.

19th century

1800s–1850s

 1801
 February 24: US Congress establishes the District of Columbia (comprising Washington County, Alexandria, and Alexandria County).
 March 4: US president Jefferson inaugurated.
 1802
 "City of Washington" incorporated; mayor-council government established.
 Jail built.
 1806 – Public school opens.
 1809 – May 20: Long Bridge crossing the Potomac River near 14th Street SW opens.
 1814 – August 24: Burning of Washington by British forces.
 1815 – Washington City Canal begins operating.
 1816 – St. John's Episcopal Church, Lafayette Square built.
 1818 – Central heating system installed in the U.S. Capitol building.
 1835
 Baltimore and Ohio Railroad begins operating.
 Labor strike by federal navy yard workers.
 1836 - December 15: 1836 U.S. Patent Office fire.
 1840 - Population: 23,364 in city; 43,712 in district.
 1842 – United States Naval Observatory established.
 1844 – Baltimore-Washington telegraph begins operating.
 1846
 District of Columbia retrocession of Alexandria and Alexandria County to Virginia.
 National Smithsonian Institution established.
 1848
 Cornerstone of the Washington Monument placed.
Washington Gas Light Company established.
 1850
 District of Columbia's stone for the Washington Monument dedicated.
 Congress abolishes slave trade in the District of Columbia.
 1851
 University of the District of Columbia founded (formerly known as Miner Normal School).
 1855 - Smithsonian Institution Building (The Castle) completed.

1860s–1890s

 1860 – Population: 61,122.
 1862 – Slavery abolished. Congress requires city to provide schooling for black students.
 1863 – National Academy of Sciences headquartered in city.
 1864 – July: Battle of Fort Stevens.
 1865 
April 14: Assassination of president Lincoln.
first black school opens at 2nd and C, SE
 1867
 Howard University founded.
 "Blacks given right of suffrage."
 1869
 National Convention of the Colored Men of America held in city.
 American Equal Rights Association meets in city.
 1870
 Children's Hospital established.
 Population: 109,199.
 1871
 District of Columbia Organic Act of 1871 effected.
 Norton P. Chipman becomes delegate to the US House of Representatives from the District of Columbia.
 1877 – Washington Post newspaper begins publication.
 1878 – Telephone begins operating.
 1880 – Population: 147,293 in city; 177,624 in district.
 1881
 February: Flood.
 "Tiber Canal filled in to become Constitution Avenue."
 American National Red Cross headquartered in city.
 1885 – Washington Monument dedicated.
 1888 – Electric streetcar begins operating.
 1889 – National Zoo opens.
 1890
 Rock Creek Park established.
 Population: 230,392.
 1893 – American University founded.
 1897 – American Negro Academy founded.
 1899 – Height of Buildings Act of 1899 legislated.
 1900 – Population: 278,718.

20th century

1900s–1940s

 1902 – McMillan Plan for design of city introduced.
 1906 – District Building (city hall) constructed.
 1907
 Union Station built.
 Washington National Cathedral construction begins.
 1910 – Population: 331,069.
 1912 – "Cherry trees planted around the Tidal Basin."
 1913  
 1915 – Association for the Study of Negro Life and History established.
 1917 – National Sylvan Theater opens.
 1919 – July: Racial unrest.
 1920 
 Population: 437,571.
 Dedication of the 16th Street World War I Memorial Trees
 1922
 January 28: Storm crushes Knickerbocker Theatre.
 May 30: Lincoln Memorial dedicated.
 1923 – Smithsonian's Freer Gallery of Art opens.
 1924
 National Capital Park Commission established.
 Washington Senators baseball team wins 1924 World Series.
 1925 – WMAL radio begins broadcasting.
 1926 – Federal Triangle construction begins.
 1930 – Population: 486,869.
 1931 – National Symphony Orchestra formed.
 1932
 May: "Bonus Army" demonstration.
 Arlington Memorial Bridge opens.
 Folger Shakespeare Library built.
 1935 – National Cherry Blossom Festival begins.
 1937 – Washington Redskins football team active.
 1940 – Population: 663,091.
 1941
 National Airport built.
 National Gallery of Art opens.
 1942 – Declaration by United Nations signed in city.
 1944 – International Dumbarton Oaks Conference held in city.
 1946 - International Monetary Fund headquartered in city.
 1947 - WMAL-TV, WRC-TV, and WTTG (television) begin broadcasting.
 1949
 Whitehurst Freeway begins operating.
 WTOP-TV (television) begins broadcasting.

1950s–1990s
 1950 – Population: 802,178.
 1953 – January 15: 1953 Pennsylvania Railroad train wreck.
 1954 
March 1: United States Capitol shooting incident (1954).
Bolling v. Sharpe decided, schools integrated in 54–55 school year
 1957 – May 17: National Prayer Pilgrimage for Freedom civil rights demonstration takes place in D.C.
 1959 – International Antarctic Treaty signed in city.
 1960
 Treaty of Mutual Cooperation and Security between the United States and Japan signed in city.
 Population: 763,956.
 1962 – Streetcar stops operating.
 1963 – August 28: March on Washington for Jobs and Freedom; Martin Luther King Jr. gives "I Have a Dream" speech.
 1964
 November: "D.C. residents are able to vote for president for the first time."
 Capital Beltway constructed.
 1965
 April 17: March Against the Vietnam War.
 Washingtonian magazine begins publication.
 1967
 Mayor-council form of government implemented; Walter Washington becomes mayor.
 Smithsonian Folklife Festival begins.
 Biograph cinema opens.
 1968
 April: 1968 Washington, D.C. riots occur.
 American Association of Retired Persons headquartered in city (approximate date).
 1969
 November 15: Protest against Vietnam War.
 Gay Blade newspaper begins publication.
 Key Theatre in business.
 1970 – Population: 756,510.
 1971
 April: Antiwar protest.
 May: 1971 May Day protests against war.
 June 30: New York Times Co. v. United States decided; allows Washington Post to publish Pentagon Papers about Vietnam.
 Walter E. Fauntroy becomes delegate to the US House of Representatives from the District of Columbia.
 National Kennedy Center for the Performing Arts opens.
 Center for Science in the Public Interest headquartered in city.
 1972 - Watergate scandal discovered.
 1973 - Mayoral election established, per US Congress' District of Columbia Home Rule Act.
 1974
 1974 White House helicopter incident
 Smithsonian's Hirshhorn Museum opens.
 1976
 March: Washington Metro begins operating.
 May: Concorde supersonic airplane begins operating.
 US Bicentennial held.
 1979
 Marion Barry becomes mayor.
 C-SPAN begins televising federal government proceedings.
 1980
 Western Plaza (later renamed to "Freedom Plaza") containing a raised marble inlay depicting parts of the L'Enfant Plan for the city of Washington opens along Pennsylvania Avenue N.W. between the White House and the United States Capitol.
 1981
 March 30: Attempted assassination of president Reagan.
 Washington City Paper begins publication.
 1982
 January 13: Crash of Air Florida Flight 90.
 Washington Convention Center built.
 National Vietnam Veterans Memorial erected.
 Washington Times newspaper begins publication.
 1983
 1983 U.S. Senate bombing
 1985 
 Federal News Service in business.
 National Building Museum opens
 Washington Printmakers Gallery opens.
 1987
 Smithsonian's Sackler Gallery and National Museum of African Art open.
 Dupont Circle 5 cinema in business.
 1990
 Population: 606,900.
 October 27: Mayor Marion Barry receives six-month prison sentence for cocaine possession.
 November 6: Sharon Pratt Dixon wins mayoral election.
 1991
 Eleanor Holmes Norton becomes delegate to the US House of Representatives from the District of Columbia.
 City bicentennial.
 1993 
 United States Holocaust Memorial Museum opens
 National Postal Museum opens
 1994 – November 8:  Marion Barry wins mayoral election.
 1995
 April 17: President William J. Clinton signs the District of Columbia Financial Responsibility and Management Assistance Act of 1995, establishing the District of Columbia Financial Control Board.  
 October 16: National Million Man March held in city.
 1996 – City website online (approximate date).
 1997 – July 7: Starbucks triple homicide in Georgetown
 1998 – United States Capitol shooting incident
 1999 – Anthony A. Williams becomes mayor.
 2000 – May 14: Million Mom March held.

21st century

 2001 - September: 2001 anthrax attacks.
 2002 - International Spy Museum opens
 2003 – Washington Convention Center rebuilt.
 2007 – Adrian Fenty becomes mayor.
 2008 
 Nationals Park opens.
 Newseum opens in D.C.. 
 2009
 January 20: Inauguration of U.S. president Obama.
 Night at the Museum: Battle of the Smithsonian is released, taking place in D.C.
 The District survives Snowmageddon
 2010 – Population: 601,723.
 2011
 Vincent C. Gray becomes mayor.
 CityCenterDC construction begins.
 2014
 Initiative 71 approved by voters, leading to the legalization of cannabis
 2015 – Muriel Bowser becomes mayor.
 2016
 January 2016 United States winter storm.
 DC Streetcar begins operating.
 March–April: 2016 Nuclear Security Summit.
 National Museum of African American History and Culture opens to the public.
 District of Columbia statehood referendum, 2016
 2017
 January 20: Inauguration of U.S. President Donald Trump 
 January 21: National Women's March on Washington scheduled.
 2018 – The Washington Capitals win their first Stanley Cup in franchise history.
 2019 – The Washington Nationals win the World Series.
 2020 – The coronavirus disease 2019 causes the District to lock down for the first time in history.
 2021
January 6: Storming of the United States Capitol.
January 20: Inauguration of U.S. President Joe Biden
April 2: Vehicle-ramming attack outside the United States Capitol.

See also
 History of Washington, D.C.
 List of mayors of Washington, D.C.
 :Category:African-American history of Washington, D.C.
 National Register of Historic Places listings in Washington, D.C.
 List of National Historic Landmarks in Washington, D.C.
 List of United States Congresses
 List of US presidential inaugural ceremonies
 Timeline of Alexandria, Virginia
 List of rallies and protest marches in Washington, D.C.
 Architecture of Washington, D.C.

References

Bibliography

 
 
 1864
 
 
 
 
 
 1901
 
 1903

External links

 
  (Sortable by decade)

washington
Washington, D.C.-related lists
Years in Washington, D.C.
Washington, D.C.